Captain William Stanley Jenkins  was a Canadian flying ace during World War I. He was officially credited with 12 aerial victories, having scored his first two while still on sick leave.

Early life and entry into military
Jenkins was born in Russell, Ontario, Canada, on 26 May 1890 to Robert S Jenkins and Annie Bickford. He enlisted into the Canadian military on 9 October 1915. His enlistment papers list his next of kin as his mother, Mrs. R. S. Jenkins. Jenkins gave his profession as "window dresser", and claimed three years experience in the militia in the First Grenadier Guards. The medical clearance was dated 1 December 1915. The young recruit was assigned to 87th Battalion (Canadian Grenadier Guards), CEF and served as a corporal in France. He transferred to the Royal Flying Corps in May 1917.

A surviving memo by Jenkins gives some insight into his transition into the RFC. He was training with 87 Training Squadron in Canada, beginning perhaps as early as August 1917, when it moved overseas. This interruption to his training shunted him off to No. 40 Squadron RAF at Croydon, England, where he was forced to repeat some of his training. He had 39 hours 55 minutes in his pilot's log by 25 March 1918. He then had to wait out bad weather and a shortage of aircraft to make his final flight. As a result, his date of rank was 1 April 1918, leaving him shy of one day's seniority for promotion.

World War I

Promotions and appointments
On 2 October 1917, Jenkins was appointed temporary captain while still a second lieutenant.

On 25 January 1918, he was relieved of duties as captain and second in command of a siege battalion. On 1 February 1918, he was again appointed temporary captain, with the actual rank of second lieutenant. On 13 March 1918, he was posted to 40 Squadron. Upon completion of training, he moved on to 210 Squadron on either 15 or 19 May 1918; his admission to hospital at this time may have confused the record. He would not officially return to duty until 2 August 1918.

In the meantime, on 28 June 1918, he relinquished the rank of captain when he ceased being second in command of a siege battalion; once again, he reverted to second lieutenant.

Aerial success
Jenkins used his Sopwith Camel to destroy a German Albatros D.V fighter on 27 May 1918. On 6 June, he teamed with fellow Canadian John Gerald Manuel to destroy an enemy reconnaissance two-seater aircraft over Doulieu. It appears that while Jenkins was still technically convalescent, he was not too ill to fight. He would not be discharged from hospital until 2 August 1918.

He then ran off a string of eight consecutive triumphs over German fighters during August, September, and October. On 3 October, he was injured; he returned to duty on the 14th. The day before the armistice, 10 November 1918, he destroyed a DFW C.V reconnaissance aircraft and a Fokker D.VII. Jenkins thus ended his war with a tally of two Fokker D.VIIs set afire in flight, five other German fighters destroyed, two German reconnaissance aircraft destroyed, and three enemy aircraft driven down out of control. He had twice won the Distinguished Flying Cross for his valour.

Also on 10 November, Jenkins' Officer Commanding recommended him for both promotion and decoration. The recommendation for decoration noted that Jenkins had flown some very effective ground attack missions during early November, and mentions a victory over a German kite balloon. An attachment, listing his victories, lists a victory date not seen elsewhere, on 14 August 1918. If Jenkins was indeed a balloon buster, it seems likely he downed the gasbag on this date.

List of aerial victories

Post World War I
Jenkins remained in the Royal Air Force postwar. On 11 December 1918, he addressed the memo to his Officer Commanding concerning the shortage of a day's seniority for promotion. He would be repatriated on 6 April 1919.

Honours and awards
Distinguished Flying Cross

2nd Lt. William Stanley Jenkins, Sea Patrol.
"An intrepid pilot who has met with much success in numerous battles. On one day last month he led three machines in an attack on seven of the enemy. He engaged in combat with four separate enemy machines, set fire to one at a height of 14,000 feet, and then, getting on the tail of another, fired 150 rounds into it, resulting in complete destruction. Lt. Jenkins has, on previous occasions, destroyed or brought down out of control six enemy aircraft."

Bar to the Distinguished Flying Cross
2nd Lieut. William Stanley Jenkins, D.F.C.
"An exceptionally skilful pilot, conspicuous for his courage and disregard of danger. Since 5 October he has accounted for four enemy aeroplanes crashed and one driven down out of control. On 10 November he crashed an enemy two-seater, and later on destroyed a Fokker, in addition to attacking enemy troops and transport with marked success."

References
Citations

Bibliography
 
 

Royal Flying Corps officers
Canadian World War I flying aces
British World War I flying aces
Recipients of the Distinguished Flying Cross (United Kingdom)
Canadian people of English descent
1890 births
Date of death missing
Year of death missing